2013–14 Belarusian Cup was the twenty third season of the Belarusian annual cup competition. Contrary to the league season, it is conducted in a fall-spring rhythm. The first games played on 29 May 2013. Shakhtyor Soligorsk, winner of the Cup, qualified for the second qualifying round of the 2014–15 UEFA Europa League.

Participating clubs 
The following teams took part in the competition:

Preliminary round
In this round six winners of regional cups (amateur teams) played against six teams from the Second League. The draw was conducted on 21 May 2013. The matches were played on 29 May 2013.

First round
In this round six winners of preliminary round are joined by another six teams from Second League and 10 clubs from the First League.

Another five First League clubs were given a bye to the next round: Gorodeya, Volna Pinsk, Slutsk, Lida (top four clubs in the league table as of the draw date) and SKVICH Minsk (by drawing of lots). The reserve teams (Minsk-2 and Vitebsk-2) were not allowed to participate.

The draw was conducted on 30 May 2013. The matches were played on 12 June 2013.

Second round
In this round eleven winners of the First Round are joined by another five teams from First League and 8 clubs from the Premier League.

The four Premier League clubs that qualified for 2013–14 European Cups (BATE Borisov, Minsk, Shakhtyor Soligorsk and Dinamo Minsk) were given a bye to the next round.

The draw was conducted on 17 June 2013. The matches were played on 27 and 28 July 2013.

Round of 16
The draw was conducted on 29 July 2013. The matches will be played on 24 and 25 August 2013. The match involving Minsk was moved to 7 September due to team's participation in UEFA Europa League play-off round.

Quarterfinal
The draw was conducted on 16 September 2013. The matches were played on 22 March 2014.

Semifinal
The draw was conducted on 24 March 2014. The matches were played 15 April 2014.

Final
The match was played on 3 May 2014. It was the first official match at the newly built Borisov Arena.

See also
 2013 Belarusian Premier League
 2014 Belarusian Premier League
 2013 Belarusian First League

References

External links
 Football.by

2013–14 domestic association football cups
Cup
Cup
2013-14